Henry Layfield Mainman (7 April 1877 – 1953) was an English footballer who played in the Football League for Burton Swifts and Notts County.

References

1877 births
1953 deaths
English footballers
Association football defenders
English Football League players
Everton F.C. players
Liverpool F.C. players
Burton Swifts F.C. players
Reading F.C. players
Notts County F.C. players